Adam Neuhaus is an American producer and entertainment executive noted for producing non-fiction television programming. He is Senior Director of Development for ESPN Films, leading creative development for the 30 for 30 documentary series, including feature documentaries, shorts, and podcasts. Neuhaus helped create 30 for 30 Podcasts, which launched in 2017. 

He is the founder of Neuhaus Ideas, an ideas company serving the media industry, and the founder of NYC-based media networking group Headsets & Highballs. He has been an active member on the Board of Directors and Advisory Board for the Ghetto Film School, a Bronx-based nonprofit organization that teaches high school students about film-making.

Neuhaus's notable producer credits include Sterling Affairs, Be Water, Once Upon A Time in Queens, 144, and Lance of the 30 for 30 franchise, as well as the video game 1979 Revolution: Black Friday.

His past positions include senior director of development, media and entertainment at Radical Media, director of development at Original Media LLC, and roles in the motion picture literary departments of the Paradigm Talent Agency and William Morris Agency.

References

External links
Official website for Neuhaus Ideas
Official website for the Ghetto Film School

Official website of Headsets & Highballs

Living people
American television producers
Place of birth missing (living people)
Year of birth missing (living people)